Heinrich "Hein" Severloh (23 June 1923 – 14 January 2006) was a soldier in the German 352nd Infantry Division stationed in Normandy in 1944. He became famous for a memoir WN 62 – Erinnerungen an Omaha Beach Normandie, 6. Juni 1944, published in 2000. In the book, the authors claim that as a machine gunner, Severloh inflicted over 1,000 and possibly over 2,000 casualties to the American soldiers landing on Omaha Beach on D-Day. However, Severloh's claim is not viewed as credible by either US or German historians. Total US casualties (killed, wounded, and missing) from all sources along the five-mile length of Omaha Beach on D-Day are estimated at 2,400.

Early life 
Severloh was born into a farming family in Metzingen in the Lüneburg Heath area of North Germany, close to the small city of Celle.

Service in the Wehrmacht 
Conscripted into the Wehrmacht on 23 July 1941, at the age of 18, Severloh was assigned to the 19th Light Artillery Replacement Division in Hanover. In August, he was transferred to France to join the 3rd Battery of the 321st Artillery Regiment, where he trained as a dispatch rider. In December 1942, he was sent to the Eastern Front and assigned to the rear of his division to drive sleighs. As punishment for making dissenting remarks, he was forced to perform physical exertions that left him with permanent health problems and necessitated six-month convalescence in a hospital. After this, he went on leave to his family's farm to help gather the harvest.

In October 1943, Severloh was sent for non-commissioned officer training in Brunswick, but was recalled after less than a month to rejoin his unit which had been reclassified as the 352nd Infantry Division and was stationed in Normandy.

Omaha Beach 

Omaha Beach extends for 5 miles (8 km) from east of Sainte-Honorine-des-Pertes to west of Vierville-sur-Mer. The beach defences at Omaha consisted of 8 concrete bunkers containing 75 mm or greater artillery, 35 pillboxes, 18 anti-tank guns, six mortar pits, 35 Nebelwerfer (multi-barrel rocket launchers), 85 machine gun nests, 6 tank turrets and supporting infantry.

Infantry deployments on the Beach consisted of five companies concentrated at 15 strongpoints called Widerstandsnester (Resistance Nests), numbered WN-60 in the east to WN-74 in the west. Severloh was part of WN-62, the largest strongpoint defending Omaha Beach.

The American plan of attack divided Omaha Beach into ten sectors, codenamed Able, Baker, Charlie, Dog Green, Dog White, Dog Red, Easy Green, Easy Red, Fox Green, and Fox Red. WN-62 at the eastern side of Omaha Beach overlooked both Easy Red and Fox Green sectors.

Widerstandsnest 62 

WN-62 was 332 meters long by 324 meters wide and between 12 and 50 meters above the beach, depending on the distance from the shore, with a good overview of the beach area.

On D-Day (June 6, 1944) WN-62 was manned by 27 members of the 716th Infantry Division and 13 members of Severloh's 352nd Division, whose task was to direct fire of the 10.5 cm artillery batteries located 5 kilometres inland at Houtteville.

Defences included two type H669 concrete casemates, one empty and the other with a 75mm artillery piece, a 50mm anti-tank gun, two 50mm mortars, a twin-barrelled MG 34 7.92mm machine gun on an anti-aircraft mount and two prewar Polish machine guns. Another 50 mm anti-tank gun covered the rear, and the perimeter was ringed by barbed wire and anti personnel mines.

Severloh was assigned to a Senior Lieutenant Bernhard Frerking as an orderly. While Frerking coordinated the artillery fire of the battery at Houtteville from a bunker, Severloh says he manned a MG 42 machine gun, and fired on approaching American troops with the machine gun and two Karabiner 98k rifles; while a sergeant whom he did not know, kept him supplied with ammunition from a nearby ammo bunker until 15:30. He claimed to have fired over 13,500 rounds with the machine gun and 400 with the rifles.

Interviewed in 2004, he said: "It was definitely at least 1,000 men, most likely more than 2,000. But I do not know how many men I shot. It was awful. Thinking about it makes me want to throw up."

Surrender and captivity
Severloh retreated to the nearby village of Colleville-sur-Mer, with Kurt Warnecke also from the 352nd and Franz Gockel from the 716th, where he surrendered the next day. His commanding officer, Lt. Frerking, and most of the other defenders of WN-62 were killed at their posts by American troops.

Severloh was first sent as a prisoner of war to Boston, United States. In December 1946, he was transferred to Bedfordshire, England as forced labor working on road construction. Severloh was returned to Germany in March 1947 after his father wrote to the British military authorities saying he was needed to work back on the farm.

Later life and death 
In the 1960s, an American military chaplain, David Silva, who had been wounded by three bullets in the chest on Omaha Beach, was contacted by Severloh - who had found his name in the Cornelius Ryan book The Longest Day. They later met several times, including at the 2005 reunion of Allied Forces in Normandy. On 5 June 2004 RTL showed a two-hour documentary in co-production with CBC Radio: "Mortal enemies of Omaha Beach – the story of an unusual friendship," by the filmmaker Alexander Czogalla.

In 2000, Severloh's memoir, WN 62 – Erinnerungen an Omaha Beach Normandie, 6. Juni 1944, ghostwritten by Helmut Konrad von Keusgen was published.

Severloh died 14 January 2006 in Lachendorf near his home village of Metzingen, aged 82.

Widerstandsnest 62 today 

The remains of Resistance Point 62 lie just east of the American Normandy American Cemetery and Memorial and close to the viewing platform. On the top of one casemate is a monument to honor the 5th Engineer Brigade and further toward the beach is the needle honoring the 1st Infantry Division (The Big Red One).

References

Bibliography 
 
 George Bernage: Omaha – 6. Juni 1944, Editions Heimdal, France (August 2002),

External links 
 Widerstandsnest-62 on WikkiMaps
 Large panorama shot taken from Severlohs position (on flikr)

1923 births
2006 deaths
People from Celle (district)
People from the Province of Hanover
German prisoners of war in World War II held by the United States
German prisoners of war in World War II held by the United Kingdom